"To Serve Man" is a 1950 science fiction short story written by Damon Knight.

To Serve Man may also refer to:
 To Serve Man (album), 2002 album by American death metal band Cattle Decapitation
 "To Serve Man" (The Twilight Zone), 1962 television episode based on Knight's story

See also
 Son of man came to serve, an episode in the New Testament shortly after Jesus predicts his death